Jordan Thompson was the defending champion but retired in the second round against Maverick Banes.

Jason Kubler won the title after defeating Alex Bolt 2–6, 7–6(8–6), 7–6(7–3) in the final.

Seeds

Draw

Finals

Top half

Bottom half

References
Main Draw
Qualifying Draw

Latrobe City Traralgon ATP Challenger - Singles
2017 Singles